Coeliades bocagii is a butterfly in the family Hesperiidae. It is found on Sao Tome and Principe.

References

Butterflies described in 1893
Coeliadinae
Endemic fauna of São Tomé and Príncipe